Liga Deportiva Universitaria de Quito's 1969 season was the club's 39th year of existence, the 16th year in professional football, and the 10th in the top level of professional football in Ecuador.

Squad

Competitions

Serie A

Aggregate table

Player statistics

References

External links
Official website 
LDU Quito (3) - El Nacional (1) 1st goal
LDU Quito (3) - El Nacional (1)

1969